Cryptolectica lazaroi is a moth of the family Gracillariidae. It is known from the Galápagos Islands.

The larvae feed on Ageratum conyzoides and Synedrella nodiflora. They probably mine the leaves of their host plant.

References

Acrocercopinae
Moths described in 2006